Dr. Elizabeth Cruz (formerly Troy) is a fictional character in the American television series Nip/Tuck, and is portrayed by Roma Maffia.

Character history
Liz Cruz is the head anesthesiologist for McNamara/Troy. She is often the voice of reason in the office and a strong-willed, empathetic woman. She is an out lesbian. During many surgeries, she criticizes the idea of what type of surgery they are doing and to whom. At one point, she is even questioned by detective Kit McGraw about what it is like for her to be a person with such morals in the business she is in.

Season One
Liz bonds with one of McNamara/Troy's clients, a pre-op transgender person named Sofia Lopez. Sofia finds herself falling in love with her, but Liz decides not to further their relationship. During a stand-off involving violent criminal Escobar Gallardo, she is shot and sent to Bermuda to recover.

Season Two
Liz's biological clock starts to tick, and she decides that she wants to have a baby before it is too late. After being rejected by potential donors due to her age, Liz is shocked when Christian offers his sperm to her. Despite their love/hate relationship, Liz eventually accepts his offer and becomes pregnant. Liz later aborts the baby after she is told that her child has severe congenital disabilities.

Season Three
Due to a financial crisis at McNamara/Troy, Liz resigns and takes up Julia's offer to work with her at the female-run business Spa De La Mer, where she becomes their resident General Practitioner. At the end of the season, Liz finds herself a prime suspect in the Carver mystery as she had access to Christian's sperm and could have been the one who planted it at one of the crime scenes. She is interrogated by detective Kit McGraw but is eventually released.

Season Four
Working for McNamara/Troy again, Liz witnesses her new boss Michelle Landau in a compromising position with a mystery woman. After offering Michelle emotional support, Liz finds herself accused of sexual harassment and is almost fired. Her path again crosses with Michelle when she falls victim to an elaborate kidney theft organized by Michelle's old friend James LeBeau, forcing her to recover in the hospital for weeks. She later embarks on a relationship with young anaesthesiologist Poppy, a fitness freak who encourages Liz to go under the knife. Liz eventually comes to her senses and ends their relationship. When Escobar Gallardo returns, Liz aims a gun at him and threatens to shoot but is eventually talked out of it. After Gallardo is shot dead by his wife, Liz helps Sean and Christian dispose of the body.

Season Five
Residing in Los Angeles, Liz questions Julia's lesbian relationship with Olivia Lord, believing that she is experimenting. She finds herself attracted to Olivia and kisses her at the office, which angers Julia. When Christian is diagnosed with male breast cancer, Liz begins helping out around the apartment and taking care of him. Sleeping in Christian's bed, the two end up having sex and Liz has her first orgasm with a man. Liz begins to question her sexuality but realizes that she is only in love with Christian. 

They start a brief affair but after Christian undergoes a pectoral reconstruction and returns to sleeping with numerous partners, Liz is destroyed. She quits McNamara/Troy and informs Sean she is moving back to Miami. Christian's cancer returns and he is given six months to one year to live. He returns to Miami to ask Liz to marry him. After accepting she later declines before reconsidering and agreeing to marry Christian and spends the remaining months of his life as his wife. They get married and Wilber asks Liz if he can call her mom, to which an overjoyed Liz agrees, unaware that Christian has just received news of his remission, that he does not have cancer.

 The season 5 DVD features a deleted scene from the episode Duke Collins, where Liz and Olivia are seen sleeping together. Presumably, this is not to be considered canon.

Season Six
Liz Cruz wants to be made partner in McNamara/Troy because of all the drama and crimes they have dragged her through over the years. Because she is an anaesthesiologist and not a plastic surgeon, she will not be made partner in their practice. Cruz has a date with a medical sales representative and brings her date to an orgasm, but the date is a "squirter". This turns Cruz off, but Christian Troy talks her into staying with the woman. When Liz goes to tell her she wants a relationship, the woman reveals she wants to stay with her husband and not live a gay life. Sean McNamara artificially inseminates Liz, and she announces she is pregnant.

Nip/Tuck characters
Television characters introduced in 2003
Fictional lesbians
Fictional medical personnel
Fictional nurses
Fictional LGBT characters in television
American female characters in television
sv:Nip/Tuck#Liz Cruz